Millbrook House is a training centre for disabled people in Exeter, Devon, England founded in 1937 by Dame Georgiana Buller. It was the first school dedicated to occupational therapy training in the United Kingdom.

The first intake of students began their training on 27 September 1944. The school became affiliated with the University of Exeter and the university validated all its courses. It was later renamed St Loye's College for Training the Disabled.

In 1999 the school changed its name to St Loye's School of Health Studies in order to reflect its commitment to a wide range of health and social courses while still retaining its commitment to providing occupational therapy education.

Since 2003 St Loye's has been part of the School of Health Professions of the University of Plymouth.

External links
Official website

University of Exeter
Occupational therapy organizations
University of Plymouth